Bubong, officially the Municipality of Bubong (Maranao and Iranun: Inged a Bubong), is a 2nd class municipality in the province of Lanao del Sur, Philippines. According to the 2020 census, it has a population of 26,514 people.

Geography

Barangays
Bubong is politically subdivided into 36 barangays.

Climate

Demographics

Economy

References

External links
Bubong Profile at the DTI Cities and Municipalities Competitive Index
[ Philippine Standard Geographic Code]
Philippine Census Information
Local Governance Performance Management System

Municipalities of Lanao del Sur